Kereft is a village in Sefidar Rural District, Khafr District, Jahrom County, Fars Province, Iran. At the 2006 census, its population was 1,285, in 322 families.

References 

Populated places in  Jahrom County